Pèlerins allant à La Mecque (Pilgrims Going to Mecca) is a panting by Léon Belly. It is a very large (160cm x 242cm) oil on canvas work. It won a first class medal at the Salon of 1861, was bought by the state from the artist, and originally displayed at the Musée du Luxembourg. Since 1983 it has been part of the collection at the Musée d'Orsay. From the time it was first exhibited it has been considered a masterpiece of orientalist painting.

Subject
The work depicts a caravan of Muslims going on the Hajj pilgrimage to Mecca. In 1856, the artist had come across such a caravan while he was in Egypt and then worked for nearly three years to create this work. The precision with which Belly depicted both the camels and the human figures gives this painting an almost photographic quality.

Compared with many more romantic portrayals of Middle Eastern people, Belly’s work is both realistic and sympathetic. His pilgrims are elderly, tired, and very ordinary looking, though their composure, as well as the work’s composition, lend them a quality of nobility. Belly was concerned to portray an ethnographically exact image of a pilgrimage. One of the most important elements of the painting is the way it uses the effects of light. Additionally, it was one of the first orientalist works to give prominence to the camel.

History
The painting has been featured in numerous exhibitions, including:

1861 Salon - palais des Champs Elysées - Paris
1867 Exposition Universelle - Paris
1873 Vienna World's Fair 
1977 Léon Belly - Saint-Omer 1827-Paris 1877 - Rétrospective, :fr: Musée de l'hôtel Sandelin - Saint-Omer
 1984 The Orientalists : Delacroix to Matisse - European painters in North Africa and the Near East, Royal Academy of Arts - London
 2008-9 Orte der Sehnsucht. Mit Kunstlern auf Reisen, Westphalian State Museum of Art and Cultural History - Münster
 2014 AlHajj - Institut du monde arabe - Paris
 2015 El canto del cisne. Pinturas académicas del Salón de Paris. Colecciones Musée d'Orsay - Fundación Mapfre - Madrid

External links
(YouTube) video (in French) about the painting

References

1861 paintings
Orientalist paintings
Paintings in the collection of the Musée d'Orsay
Hajj
Oil on canvas paintings
French paintings